Colombo is a  city of about 247,000 inhabitants in the Southern Brazilian state of Paraná; is the third largest city in Greater Curitiba, with the largest one being Curitiba.

It was founded on 5 February 1890. It is located at  25º17'30" S,  49º13'27" W, at an elevation of about 1000 metres above sea level, some 18 km from state capital Curitiba. The city is the largest Italian colony in the state.

References

Municipalities in Paraná